"Relationship" is a song by American rapper Young Thug from his mixtape Beautiful Thugger Girls (2017). It features American rapper Future and was produced by the Billboard Hitmakers and BLSSD.

Composition
In the song, Young Thug and Future brag about having relationships with multiple women but also address the problems from having too many of them; in the hook, Future mentions being in a "relationship with all my bitches", and needing to "cut some of 'em off". Young Thug sings about buying a woman anything she wants, while Future sings about keeping his girlfriends stylish.

Critical reception
Renato Pagnani of The A.V. Club praised the collaboration of the rappers, writing "their combined pop instincts inject a paean to, er, unidirectional polyamory with way more charm than it has any right to possess. Having inherited the belt from Lil Wayne—Thug's biggest influence, both in terms of subject matter and his off-the-wall delivery—no one raps about sex more joyously than Young Thug." Gary Suarez of Crack Magazine wrote, "Booming ballad Relationship arrives with an instantly memorable Future-sung hook in tow."

Music video
A music video for the song was released on September 27, 2017. Directed by Young Thug and The Rite Brothers, it was shot in Miami and filmed on a grainy VHS camera. The video pays homage to Girls Gone Wild; At the start, a fake Girls Gone Wild VHS cover reading "Raw! Real! Uncut!" appears on screen with instructions to order it as a tape. The clip finds Thug and Future on a yacht full of women in bikinis, partying and dancing with them. It features scenes of twerking and nudity that are censored by the words "NOT ON TV" and "CENSORED".

Charts

Certifications

References

2017 songs
Young Thug songs
Future (rapper) songs
Songs written by Young Thug
Songs written by Future (rapper)